One Mississippi is a semi-autobiographical American comedy television series created by comedian Tig Notaro and Diablo Cody.  The pilot episode, directed by Nicole Holofcener, aired on Amazon Prime Video on November 5, 2015, and was picked up for a full series after positive feedback from audiences. One Mississippi premiered on September 9, 2016. On November 14, 2016, Amazon renewed the show for a second season, which was released on Amazon on September 8, 2017. On January 18, 2018, the series was canceled after two seasons which Amazon explained as "part of a move towards bigger, wider-audience series". Eventually as the show is produced by FXP, A division of FX Networks (also owned by Disney) and Disney Television Studios, Disney pulled One Mississippi from Amazon Prime Video, although it has since returned. Currently One Mississippi streams on Disney+ Star internationally and on FX on Hulu in the U.S. as well.

Plot
Los Angeles radio host Tig Bavaro returns to Bay St. Louis, Mississippi, after receiving news that her mother, Caroline, will be taken off life support following an unexpected fall. Recovering from both a double mastectomy and a C. difficile infection, Tig moves in temporarily alongside her brother Remy and her stepfather, Bill. While caring for family affairs after Caroline's death, Tig learns about her mother's past as it was lived, rather than as Tig first remembered it, and in doing so rediscovers life in Bay St. Louis.

Cast

Main
 Tig Notaro as Tig Bavaro
 Noah Harpster as Remy
 John Rothman as Bill

Recurring
 Rya Kihlstedt as Caroline
 Casey Wilson as Brooke
 Stephanie Allynne as Kate
 Sheryl Lee Ralph as Felicia Hollingsworth
 Carly Jibson as Desiree
 Beth Grant as Mellie Saint-Clair
 Carol Mansell as Beulah Lancaster
 Timm Sharp as Jack Hoffman

Episodes

Season 1 (2015–16)

Season 2 (2017)

Reception
One Mississippi received positive reviews from critics.  Rotten Tomatoes gives the series a 96% 'Certified Fresh' rating based on reviews from 40 critics, with the site's critical consensus stating: "One Mississippi proves an honest vehicle for its moving dramatic narrative, observational comedy, and the genuine acting skills of its lead, Tig Notaro."  Metacritic gives the series a 77 out of 100 score based on reviews from 20 critics, indicating 'generally favorable' reviews.

Notes

References

External links
 

2015 American television series debuts
2017 American television series endings
2010s American comedy-drama television series
Lesbian-related television shows
Television series about cancer
Television shows set in Mississippi
Amazon Prime Video original programming
2010s American LGBT-related comedy television series
Television series by 20th Century Fox Television
Television series by Amazon Studios
Television series created by Tig Notaro
Television series created by Diablo Cody
American LGBT-related web series